Yeo Hoe-hyun (hangul: 여회현; born May 9, 1994) is a South Korean actor.

Filmography

Film

Television series

Web series

Awards and nominations

References

1994 births
Living people
South Korean male television actors
South Korean male film actors
South Korean male stage actors
South Korean male musical theatre actors
South Korean male web series actors
People from Gwangju
Hamyang Yeo clan